Vertex Venture Holdings, also known as Vertex Holdings, is an investment holding company with a group of venture capital funds worldwide. A subsidiary of Temasek Holdings, the company focuses on venture capital investment opportunities in the information technology and healthcare markets through its global family of six direct investment venture funds. Vertex provides anchor funding and operational support to these funds. Each fund has its own General Partners and investment teams, focusing on different regional markets. Its six funds are based across Southeast Asia and India, United States of America, China and Israel.

History 
Incorporated in 1988, Vertex Holdings started as a corporate venture capital (CVC) under Singapore Technologies. The company became a full subsidiary of Temasek Holdings in 2004, after the dot-com bubble. In 2008, a new CEO, Chua Kee Lock, was brought in and in 2015, Vertex Holdings was transformed to an investment holding company, with direct investments made by a network of five VC funds across the world. The Vertex Growth fund was the sixth fund added in 2019 to focus on growth-stage opportunities from the other five early-stage Vertex Ventures funds. In 2019, Vertex Holdings also raised money from foreign investors for its master fund for the first time, receiving $180 million from Japanese investors.
 
Based in Singapore, Vertex Holdings manages over $5 billion in AUM. Some well known investments made by Vertex funds include Argus, Chipscreen, CyberArk, Grab, Meta Networks, Mobike, Twelve and Waze.

References

External links
 Home page

Private equity
Financial services companies established in 1988
Singaporean companies established in 1988
Financial services companies of Singapore